I Can't Give You Anything But Love, Baby is a 1940 American musical comedy film starring Broderick Crawford and Jessie Ralph. It was also released under the title Trouble in B flat.

Cast
Broderick Crawford as Sonny McGann
Jessie Ralph as Mama McGann
Johnny Downs as Bob Gunther
Peggy Moran as Linda Carroll
Gertrude Michael as Magsa Delys / Sadie
Warren Hymer as Big Foot Louie

Production
Around the time that the film was produced, Universal Studios were producing a number of musicals named after well-known songs, such as Ma, He's Making Eyes At Me and I'm Nobody's Sweetheart Now.

I Can't Give You Anything But Love, Baby was named after a 1928 song of the same name, written by Jimmy McHugh and Dorothy Fields. McHugh agreed with the use of the title song in the film, sung by Peggy Moran, but did not want to compose further songs for the film's soundtrack. The rest of the film's songs were composed by Frank Skinner and Paul Smith and included the titles "The Tomato Juice Song" and "Sweetheart of Public School 59".

References

External links
 
 

1940 films
1940 musical comedy films
American musical comedy films
American black-and-white films
1940s English-language films
Films directed by Albert S. Rogell
Universal Pictures films
1940s American films